Asia Nakibuuka (born 28 December 2002) is a Ugandan footballer who plays as a defender for FUFA Women Super League club Kawempe Muslim Ladies FC and the Uganda women's national team.

Club career
Nakibuuka has played for Kawempe Muslim Ladies in Uganda.

International career
Nakibuuka capped for Uganda at senior level during the 2021 COSAFA Women's Championship and the 2022 Africa Women Cup of Nations qualification.

References

External links

2002 births
Living people
Ugandan women's footballers
Women's association football defenders
Uganda women's international footballers